Music is the third studio album by American singer-songwriter Carole King. The album was released in December 1971.

Background
Being written by the singer and produced by Lou Adler, the album is a continuation of the style laid down in Tapestry. King plays the piano and celeste on many tracks. The front cover photograph was taken by Jim McCrary of King at 8815 Appian Way, Laurel Canyon, California.

Legacy
Upon release, the album quickly rose to the top of the charts. It features songs such as "It's Going to Take Some Time" (US No. 12 by The Carpenters), "Sweet Seasons", a No. 9 hit for Carole King, and "Brother, Brother".

While not as groundbreaking or as successful as King's Tapestry album, Carole King: Music experienced immediate success and was certified gold on December 9, 1971, days after release. It was certified platinum on July 17, 1995. The album reportedly sold 1,300,000 copies in the United States on the day of its release.  However, platinum status for albums (one million units sold), wasn't created by the RIAA until 1976.

Music entered the top ten at No. 8, becoming the first of many weeks both Tapestry and Carole King: Music would occupy the top ten simultaneously. The album hit No. 1 on New Year's Day 1972 and stayed there for three consecutive weeks.

Track listing
All songs written by Carole King, except where noted.
Side one
"Brother, Brother" – 3:00
"It's Going to Take Some Time" (Carole King, Toni Stern) – 3:35
"Sweet Seasons" (Carole King, Toni Stern) – 3:15
"Some Kind of Wonderful" (Carole King, Gerry Goffin) – 3:07
"Surely" – 4:58
"Carry Your Load" – 2:52
Side two
"Music" – 3:50
"Song of Long Ago" – 2:44
"Brighter" – 2:46
"Growing Away from Me" – 3:03
"Too Much Rain" (Carole King, Toni Stern) – 3:35
"Back to California" – 3:23

Personnel
Carole King – vocals, piano, electric piano, electric celeste, backing vocals
Ralph Schuckett – organ on "Sweet Seasons" and "Surely", electric piano on "Back to California", electric celeste on "Growing Away from Me"
Danny Kortchmar – acoustic and electric guitars; backing vocals on "Song of Long Ago"
James Taylor – acoustic guitar on "Some Kind of Wonderful", "Song of Long Ago" and "Too Much Rain", backing vocals refrain on "Some Kind of Wonderful"
Charles Larkey – electric and acoustic bass guitar
Joel O'Brien – drums
Russ Kunkel – drums on "Back to California"
Ms. Bobbye Hall – congas, bongos, tambourine
Teresa Calderon – congas on "Brother, Brother"
Curtis Amy – tenor saxophone on "Brother, Brother", Sweet Seasons" and "Music", electric flute on "Surely"
Oscar Brashear – flugelhorn on "Sweet Seasons" and "Carry Your Load"
William Green – woodwind, flute, saxophone
Buddy Collette – woodwind, flute, saxophone
Ernest Watts – woodwind, flute, saxophone
Plas Johnson – woodwind, flute, saxophone
Mike Altschul – woodwind, flute, saxophone
Abigale Haness – backing vocals on "Some Kind of Wonderful", "Surely", "Music", "Brighter" and "Growing Away from Me"
Merry Clayton – backing vocals "second woooh" on "Back to California"

Production
Lou Adler – producer
Hank Cicalo – engineer
Norm Kinney – assistant engineer
Roland Young – art direction
Chuck Beeson – design
Jim McCrary – photography

Charts

Weekly charts

Year-end charts

Certifications

References

1971 albums
Carole King albums
Epic Records albums
Albums produced by Lou Adler
Ode Records albums